Mari Molid (born 8 August 1990) is a former Norwegian handball player, who last played for Byåsen HE and the Norwegian national team.

She made her debut on the Norwegian national team in 2010.

Achievements
Olympic Games:
Bronze Medalist: 2016
World Championship:
Winner: 2011, 2015
European Championship:
Winner: 2010
Junior World Championship:
Winner: 2010
Junior European Championship:
Winner: 2009
Norwegian Championship:
Winner: 2014/2015, 2015/2016
Norwegian Cup:
Winner: 2007, 2014, 2015
Finalist: 2008, 2009
 Danish Cup:
Winner: 2016

References

External links

1990 births
Living people
Sportspeople from Trondheim
Norwegian female handball players
Handball players at the 2016 Summer Olympics
Olympic handball players of Norway
Olympic bronze medalists for Norway
Medalists at the 2016 Summer Olympics
Olympic medalists in handball
Expatriate handball players
Norwegian expatriate sportspeople in Denmark